Martin Joseph Grebb (September 2, 1945 – January 1, 2020) was an American keyboardist, guitarist, and saxophonist. A member of The Buckinghams in the late 1960s, Grebb was also a record producer and an arranger, who worked with musicians including Peter Cetera, Bill Payne, Bonnie Raitt, Eric Clapton, Etta James, and Leon Russell.

Early life
Marty Grebb was born and raised in Chicago. He began studying music after his eighth birthday. His early interest in music can be attributed to his father, Harry, who was a saxophonist and played in the big-band era, both on the road and in the clubs of Chicago. However, Marty chose piano as his first instrument, turning to saxophone only two years later.

Career

In 1966, a local band, The Buckinghams, required the services of a keyboardist, and Marty Grebb was asked to team up with them. Around this time, the band members were introduced to James William Guercio, a former bassist and road manager for Chad & Jeremy who found them a management contract with Ebbins-Guercio Associates. The band went on to have three (Billboard) and five (Cashbox) top-ten national selling singles and three top twenty albums with Marty Grebb for Columbia Records.

After the Buckinghams, Grebb toured with a number of artists, including Leon Russell, Elton John, Muddy Waters, and most notably Bonnie Raitt as a member of her band for 25 years. He was also a touring member of Chicago in 1980 and 1981.

Later, Grebb was a member of The Weight Band, featuring former members and collaborators of The Band. Grebb contributed to The Band's Jericho and Jubilation albums. In July 2017, PBS's Infinity Hall Live program aired a televised performance by The Weight Band, featuring new music by the band.

Grebb died on January 1, 2020.

Solo discography
 Smooth Sailin'  (1999)
 High Steppin (2009)

Albums featuring Marty Grebb
This is a partial discography:
 Dick Campbell – Sings Where it's At (1965)
 Lovecraft – Valley of the Moon (1970)
 Bonnie Raitt – Give it Up (1972)
 Jackie Lomax – Three (1972)
 The Fabulous Rhinestones – The Fabulous Rhinestones (1972)
 The Tufano & Giammarese Band – The Tufano & Giammarese Band (1975)
 Jackie Lomax – Livin' For Lovin''' (1976)
 Leon & Mary Russell – Wedding Album (1976)
 Olivia Newton-John – Totally Hot (1977)
 Roger McGuinn – Thunderbyrd (1977)
 Leon & Mary Russell – Make Love to the Music (1977)
 Gary Ogan – The Road (1977)
 Leon Russell – Americana (1978)
 Wornell Jones – Wornell Jones (1979)
 Bernie Taupin – He Who Rides the Tiger (1980)
 Mickey Thomas – Alive Alone (1981)
 The Knack – Round Trip (1981)
 Joe Vitale – Plantation Harbor (1981)
 Bonnie Raitt – Nick of Time (1989)
 Chet McCracken – Flight To Moscow (1990)
 Ian McNabb – Go into the Light (1994)
 Bonnie Raitt – Longing in Their Hearts (1994)
 Maria Muldaur – Meet Me at Midnite (1994)
 The Band – Jubilation (1998)
 Bonnie Raitt – Fundamental (1998)
 Rufus Wainwright – Rufus Wainwright (1998)
 Taj Mahal – The Best of the Private Years (2000)
 JJ Cale Featuring Leon Russell – In Session at the Paradise Studios – Los Angeles, 1979 (2002)
 JJ Cale & Eric Clapton – The Road to Escondido (2006)
 Alien Ant Farm – Up in the Attic (2006)
 208 Talks of Angels – Blooming in Night'' (2014)

References

1945 births
2020 deaths
American rock guitarists
American male guitarists
American rock keyboardists
American rock saxophonists
American male saxophonists
Guitarists from Chicago
20th-century American guitarists
21st-century American saxophonists
20th-century American male musicians
21st-century American male musicians
20th-century American saxophonists